The 2018 Pittsburgh Pirates season was the franchise's 137th season overall, 132nd season as a member of the National League, and the 18th season at PNC Park. The Pirates finished the season in 4th place with a record of 82–79 and failed to qualify for the playoffs for the third consecutive season.

Offseason

Season standings

National League Central

National League playoff standings

Record vs. opponents

Detailed records

Game log

|-style="text-align:center; background:#bbb;"
|—||March 29||@ Tigers || colspan="7" |PPD, RAIN; rescheduled for Mar. 30
|-style="background:#cfc"
|1||March 30||@ Tigers || 13–10 (13) || Brault (1–0) || Wilson (0–1) ||—|| 42,516 || 1–0 || W1
|-style="text-align:center; background:#bbb;"
|—||March 31||@ Tigers || colspan="7" |PPD, RAIN; rescheduled for Apr. 1
|-

|-style=background:#cfc
|2||April 1||@ Tigers || 1–0 || Williams (1–0) || Fulmer (0–1) || Vázquez (1) || 14,858 || 2–0 || W2
|-style=background:#cfc
|3||April 1||@ Tigers || 8–6 || Kuhl (1–0) || Farmer (0–1) || Vázquez (2) || 18,438 || 3–0 || W3
|-style=background:#cfc
|4||April 2|| Twins || 5–4 || Taillon (1–0) || Lynn (0–1) || Kontos (1) || 30,186 || 4–0 || W4
|-style=background:#fbb
|5||April 4|| Twins || 3–7 || Odorizzi (1–0) || Nova (0–1) ||—|| 20,690 || 4–1 || L1
|-style=background:#cfc
|6||April 5|| Reds || 5–2 || Brault (2–0) || Bailey (0–2) || Vázquez (3) || 9,227 || 5–1 || W1
|-style=background:#cfc
|7||April 6|| Reds || 14–3 || Williams (2–0) || Castillo (0–2) ||—|| 11,115 || 6–1 || W2
|-style=background:#fbb
|8||April 7|| Reds || 4–7 || Peralta (1–0) || Kontos (0–1) || Iglesias (2) || 14,336 || 6–2 || L1
|-style=background:#cfc
|9||April 8|| Reds || 5–0 || Taillon (2–0) || Mahle (1–1) ||—|| 11,251 || 7–2 || W1
|-style="text-align:center; background:#bbb;"
|—||April 9||@ Cubs || colspan="7" |PPD, SNOW; rescheduled for Apr. 10
|-style=background:#cfc
|10||April 10||@ Cubs || 8–5 || Nova (1–1) || Chatwood (0–2) || Vázquez (4) || 40,144 || 8–2 || W2
|-style=background:#fbb
|11||April 11||@ Cubs || 5–13 || Duensing (1–0) || Glasnow (0–1) ||—|| 35,596 || 8–3 || L1
|-style=background:#cfc
|12||April 12||@ Cubs || 6–1 || Williams (3–0) || Hendricks (0–1) ||—|| 29,949 || 9–3 || W1
|-style=background:#fbb
|13||April 13||@ Marlins || 2–7 || Peters (2–1) || Kuhl (1–1) ||—|| 6,852 || 9–4 || L1
|-style=background:#cfc
|14||April 14||@ Marlins || 1–0 || Kontos (1–1) || Ziegler (0–3) || Vázquez (5) || 26,816 || 10–4 || W1
|-style=background:#cfc
|15||April 15||@ Marlins || 7–3 || Nova (1–1) || Ureña (0–3) ||—|| 10,621 || 11–4 || W2
|-style=background:#fbb
|16||April 16|| Rockies || 2–6 || Márquez (1–1) || Brault (2–1) ||—|| 8,958 || 11–5 || L1
|-style=background:#fbb
|17||April 17|| Rockies || 0–2 || Bettis (3–0) || Williams (3–1) || Davis (8) || 8,869 || 11–6 || L2
|-style=background:#cfc
|18||April 18|| Rockies || 10–2 || Kuhl (2–1) || Freeland (0–3) ||—|| 8,970 || 12–6 || W1
|-style=background:#fbb
|19||April 19||@ Phillies || 0–7 || Arrieta (2–0) || Taillon (2–1) ||—|| 19,071 || 12–7 || L1
|-style=background:#fbb
|20||April 20||@ Phillies || 1–2 || García (2–1) || Kontos (1–2) || Neris (3) || 20,183 || 12–8 || L2
|-style=background:#fbb
|21||April 21||@ Phillies || 2–6 || Nola (2–1) || Feliz (0–1) || Neris (4) || 28,161 || 12–9 || L3
|-style=background:#fbb
|22||April 22||@ Phillies || 2–3  (11) || Ríos (3–0) || Rodríguez (0–1) ||—|| 29,199 || 12–10 || L4
|-style=background:#bbb;"
|—||April 24|| Tigers || colspan="7" |PPD, RAIN; rescheduled for Apr. 25
|-style=background:#fbb
|23||April 25|| Tigers || 10–13 || Stumpf (1–0) || Taillon (2–2) || Greene (4) || N/A || 12–11 || L5
|-style=background:#cfc
|24||April 25|| Tigers || 8–3 || Kuhl (3–1) || Boyd (0–2) ||—|| 9,396 || 13–11 || W1
|-style=background:#cfc
|25||April 26|| Tigers || 1–0 || Vázquez (1–0) || Wilson (0–3) ||—|| 12,049 || 14–11 || W2
|-style=background:#cfc
|26||April 27|| Cardinals || 6–5  (11) || Kontos (2–2) || Hicks (1–1) ||—|| 15,748 || 15–11 || W3
|-style=background:#cfc
|27||April 28|| Cardinals || 6–2 || Williams (4–1) || Flaherty (0–1) ||—|| 18,568 || 16–11 || W4
|-style=background:#cfc
|28||April 29|| Cardinals || 5–0 || Kingham (1–0) || Weaver (2–2) ||—|| 14,378 || 17–11 || W5
|-style=background:#fbb
|29||April 30||@ Nationals || 2–3 || Roark (2–2) || Taillon (2–3) || Kintzler (1) || 20,879 || 17–12 || L1
|-

|-style=background:#fbb
|30||May 1||@ Nationals || 4–12 || Scherzer (6–1) || Kuhl (3–2) || — || 23,534 || 17–13 || L2
|-style=background:#fbb
|31||May 2||@ Nationals || 3–9 || Strasburg (3–3) || Nova (2–2) || — || 27,086 || 17–14 || L3
|-style=background:#fbb
|32||May 3||@ Nationals || 1–3 || Solis (1–1) || Williams (4–2) || Doolittle (6) || 30,434 || 17–15 || L4
|-style=background:#cfc
|33||May 4||@ Brewers || 6–4 || Kingham (2–0) || Guerra (2–2) || Vázquez (6) || 32,869 || 18–15 || W1
|-style=background:#fbb
|34||May 5||@ Brewers || 3–5 || Hader (1–0) || Kontos (2–3) ||—|| 32,720 || 18–16 || L1
|-style=background:#cfc
|35||May 6||@ Brewers || 9–0 || Kuhl (4–2) || Anderson (3–3) ||—|| 38,285 || 19–16 || W1
|-style=background:#cfc
|36||May 8||@ White Sox || 10–6 || Glasnow (1–1) || Volstad (0–2) ||—|| 12,871 || 20–16 || W2
|-style=background:#cfc
|37||May 9||@ White Sox || 6–5 || Rodríguez (1–1) || Jones (2–1) || Vázquez (7) || 12,476 || 21–16 || W3
|-style=background:#cfc
|38||May 11|| Giants || 11–2 || Brault (3–1) || Suarez (1–2) ||—|| 34,720 || 22–16 || W4
|-style=background:#cfc
|39||May 12|| Giants || 6–5 || Vázquez (2–0) || Watson (1–2) ||—|| 27,502 || 23–16 || W5
|-style=background:#fbb
|40||May 13|| Giants || 0–5 || Holland (2–4) || Nova (2–3) ||—|| 22,649 || 23–17 || L1
|-style=background:#cfc
|41||May 15|| White Sox || 7–0 || Williams (5–2) || López (0–3) ||—|| 11,847 || 24–17 || W1
|-style=background:#cfc
|42||May 16|| White Sox || 3–2 || Santana (1–0) || Soria (0–2) || Vázquez (8) || 20,286 || 25–17 || W2
|-style=background:#cfc
|43||May 17|| Padres || 5–4 || Santana (2–0) || Strahm (0–1) || Vázquez (9) || 11,404 || 26–17 || W3
|-style=background:#fbb
|44||May 18|| Padres || 2–3 || Ross (3–3) || Nova (2–4) || Hand (13) || 18,920 || 26–18 || L1
|-style=background:#fbb
|45||May 19|| Padres || 2–6 || Richard (3–5) || Kingham (2–1) ||—|| 20,578 || 26–19 || L2
|-style=background:#fbb
|46||May 20|| Padres || 5–8 || Yates (3–0) || Vázquez (2–1) || Hand (14) || 17,783 || 26–20 || L3
|-style=background:#fbb
|47||May 22||@ Reds || 2–7 || Harvey (1–2) || Taillon (2–4) || — || 16,144 || 26–21 || L4
|-style=background:#cfc
|48||May 23||@ Reds || 5–4 (12) || Brault (4–1) || Floro (1–1) || Crick (1) || 18,659 || 27–21 || W1
|-style=background:#fbb
|49||May 24||@ Reds || 4–5 || Castillo (4–4)  || Nova (2–5) || Hughes (2) || 14,853 || 27–22 || L1
|-style=background:#cfc
|50||May 25|| Cardinals || 8–1 || Musgrove (1–0) || Gant (1–2) ||—|| 22,629 || 28–22 || W1
|-style=background:#fbb
|51||May 26|| Cardinals || 1–4 || Flaherty (2–1) || Williams (5–3) || Norris (10) || 22,133 || 28–23 || L1
|-style=background:#fbb
|52||May 27|| Cardinals || 4–6 || Tuivailala (1–0) || Feliz (0–2) || Norris (11) || 19,608 || 28–24 || L2
|-style=background:#fbb
|53||May 28|| Cubs || 0–7 || Montgomery (1–1) || Kuhl (4–3) ||—|| 19,382|| 28–25 || L3
|-style=background:#fbb
|54||May 29|| Cubs || 6–8 || Lester (5–2) || Santana (2–1) || Morrow (12) || 11,475 || 28–26 || L4
|-style=background:#cfc
|55||May 30|| Cubs || 2–1 || Musgrove (2–0) || Hendricks (4–4) || Vázquez (10) || 14,126 || 29–26 || W1
|-style=background:#fbb
|56||May 31||@ Cardinals || 8–10 || Mayers (2–0) ||  Vázquez (2–2) ||—|| 40,832 || 29–27 || L1
|-

|-style=background:#cfc
|57||June 1||@ Cardinals || 4–0 || Taillon (3–4) || Mikolas (6–1) ||—|| 47,135 || 30–27 || W1
|-style=background:#fbb
|58||June 2||@ Cardinals || 2–3 || Norris (2–1) || Rodríguez (1–2) ||—|| 44,492 || 30–28 || L1
|-style=background:#fbb
|59||June 3||@ Cardinals || 0–5 || Wacha (7–1) || Kingham (2–2) ||—|| 44,432 || 30–29 || L2
|-style=background:#fbb
|60||June 5|| Dodgers || 0–5 || Stripling (4–1) || Musgrove (2–1) ||—|| 12,879 || 30–30 || L3
|-style=background:#cfc
|61||June 6|| Dodgers || 11–9 || Brault (5–1) || Hudson (1–2) || Vázquez (11) || 14,327 || 31–30 || W1
|-style=background:#fbb
|62||June 7|| Dodgers || 7–8 || Báez (3–3) || Taillon (3–5) || Jansen (15) || 19,713 || 31–31 || L1
|-style=background:#fbb
|63||June 8||@ Cubs || 1–3 || Montgomery (2–1) || Kuhl (4–4) || Strop (1) || 40,097 || 31–32 || L2
|-style=background:#fbb
|64||June 9||@ Cubs || 0–2 || Lester (7–2) || Kingham (2–3) || Cishek (2) || 41,045 || 31–33 || L3
|-style=background:#cfc
|65||June 10||@ Cubs || 7–1 || Nova (3–5) || Hendricks (4–6) ||—|| 40,735 || 32–33 || W1
|-style=background:#fbb
|66||June 11||@ Diamondbacks || 5–9 || Bradley (2–1) || Crick (0–1) ||—|| 20,927 || 32–34 || L1
|-style=background:#fbb
|67||June 12||@ Diamondbacks || 8–13 || Salas (4–4) || Williams (5–4) ||—|| 22,488 || 32–35 || L2
|-style=background:#cfc
|68||June 13||@ Diamondbacks || 5–4 || Taillon (4–5) || Greinke (5–5) || Vázquez (12) || 32,803 || 33–35 || W1
|-style=background:#cfc
|69||June 15|| Reds || 3–2 || Kuhl (5–4) || Harvey (1–5) || Vázquez (13) || 23,007 || 34–35 || W2
|-style=background:#cfc
|70||June 16|| Reds || 6–2 || Nova (4–5) || Castillo (4–8)|| — || 27,479 || 35–35 || W3
|-style=background:#fbb
|71||June 17|| Reds || 6–8 || DeSclafani (2–1) || Musgrove (2–2) || Iglesias (10) || 23,042 || 35–36 || L1
|-style=background:#cfc
|72||June 18|| Brewers || 1–0 || Williams (6–4) || Chacín (6–2) || Vázquez (14) || 10,672 || 36–36 || W1
|-style=background:#fbb
|73||June 19|| Brewers || 2–3 || Peralta (2–0) || Taillon (4–6) || Knebel (7) || 14,152 || 36–37 || L1
|-style="text-align:center; background:#bbb;"
|—||June 20|| Brewers || colspan="7" |PPD, RAIN; rescheduled for July 14
|-style=background:#fbb
|74||June 21|| Diamondbacks || 3–9 || Godley (8–5) || Kuhl (5–5) ||—|| 20,554 || 36–38 || L2
|-style=background:#fbb
|75||June 22|| Diamondbacks || 1–2 (13) || Chafin (1–2) || Glasnow (1–2) || McFarland (1) || 28,843 || 36–39 || L3
|-style=background:#fbb
|76||June 23|| Diamondbacks || 2–7 || Greinke (7–5) || Musgrove (2–3) ||—|| 21,121 || 36–40 || L4
|-style=background:#fbb
|77||June 24|| Diamondbacks || 0–3 || Buchholz (2–1) || Williams (6–5) || Boxberger (17) || 19,207 || 36–41 || L5
|-style=background:#cfc
|78||June 25||@ Mets || 6–4 || Taillon (5–6) || Lugo (2–3) || Vázquez (15) || 22,135 || 37–41 || W1
|-style=background:#fbb
|79||June 26||@ Mets || 3–4 (10) || Peterson (1–0) || Brault (5–2) ||—|| 24,501 || 37–42 || L1
|-style=background:#cfc
|80||June 27||@ Mets || 5–3 || Vázquez (3–2) || Familia (3–4) ||—|| 24,506 || 38–42 || W1
|-style=background:#cfc
|81||June 29||@ Padres || 6–3 || Musgrove (3–3) || Lauer (3–5)  || Vázquez (16) || 27,083 || 39–42 || W2
|-style=background:#fbb
|82||June 30||@ Padres || 3–4 || Lucchesi (4–3) || Williams (6–6) || Hand (23) || 32,418 || 39–43 || L1
|-

|-style=background:#cfc
|83||July 1||@ Padres || 7–5 || Crick (1–1) || Ross (5–6) || Vázquez (17) || 32,099 || 40–43 || W1
|-style=background:#fbb
|84||July 2||@ Dodgers || 1–17 || Wood (5–5) || Kingham (2–4) || Ferguson (1) || 45,207 || 40–44 || L1
|-style=background:#fbb
|85||July 3||@ Dodgers || 3–8 || Kershaw (2–4)  || Nova (4–6) ||—|| 48,819 || 40–45 || L2
|-style=background:#fbb
|86||July 4||@ Dodgers || 4–6 || Hill (2–3) || Holmes (0–1) || Jansen (23) || 53,139 || 40–46 || L3
|-style=background:#fbb
|87||July 6|| Phillies || 5–17 || Ramos (3–0) || Williams (6–7) ||—|| 24,846 || 40–47 || L4
|-style=background:#fbb
|88||July 7|| Phillies || 2–3 || Arrieta (6–6) || Taillon (5–7) || Arano (2) || 28,150 || 40–48 || L5
|-style=background:#cfc
|89||July 8|| Phillies || 4–1 || Kingham (3–4) || Anderson (0–1) || Vázquez (18) || 19,542 || 41–48 || W1
|-style=background:#cfc
|90||July 9|| Nationals || 6–3 || Nova (5–6) || Rodríguez (0–1) || Vázquez (19) || 14,073 || 42–48 || W2
|-style=background:#fbb
|91||July 10|| Nationals || 1–5 || Hellickson (3–1) || Musgrove (3–4) || — || 17,103 ||  42–49 || L1
|-style=background:#cfc
|92||July 11|| Nationals || 2–0 || Williams (7–7) || González (6–6) || Vázquez (20) || 21,083 || 43–49 || W1
|-style=background:#cfc
|93||July 12|| Brewers || 6–3 || Taillon (6–7) || Miley (1–1)  || Vázquez (21) || 17,858 || 44–49 || W2
|-style=background:#cfc
|94||July 13|| Brewers || 7–3 || Kingham (4–4) || Guerra (6–6) || Crick (2) || 21,431 || 45–49 || W3
|-style=background:#cfc
|95||July 14|| Brewers || 2–1 || Rodríguez (2–2) || Anderson (6–7) || Vázquez (22) || 24,474 || 46–49 || W4
|-style=background:#cfc
|96||July 14|| Brewers || 6–2 || Holmes (1–1) || Suter (8–6) || Vázquez (23) || 24,474 || 47–49 || W5
|-style=background:#cfc
|97||July 15|| Brewers || 7–6 (10) || Anderson (1–0) || Jennings (3–3) ||—|| 17,583 || 48–49 || W6
|-style=background:#bbcaff
|colspan="10"|89th All-Star Game in Washington, D.C.
|-style=background:#cfc
|98||July 20||@ Reds || 12–1 || Taillon (7–7) || Mahle (7–8) ||—|| 20,726 || 49–49 || W7
|-style=background:#cfc
|99||July 21||@ Reds || 6–2 || Kingham (5–4) || DeSclafani (4–3) ||—|| 23,244 || 50–49 || W8
|-style=background:#cfc
|100||July 22||@ Reds || 9–2 || Nova (6–6) || Harvey (5–6) ||—|| 23,615 || 51–49 || W9
|-style=background:#cfc
|101||July 23||@ Indians || 7–0 (6) || Williams (8–7) || Kluber (12–6) ||—|| 24,925 || 52–49 || W10
|-style=background:#cfc
|102||July 24||@ Indians || 9–4 || Musgrove (4–4) || Bieber (5–2) ||—|| 26,414 || 53–49 || W11
|-style=background:#fbb
|103||July 25||@ Indians || 0–4 || Bauer (9–6) || Taillon (7–8) || Hand (25) || 31,682 || 53–50 || L1
|-style=background:#fbb
|104||July 26|| Mets || 6–12 || Matz (5–8) || Kingham (5–5) ||—|| 21,981 || 53–51 || L2
|-style=background:#cfc
|105||July 27|| Mets || 5–4 || Vázquez (4–2) || Peterson (2–2) ||—|| 26,356 || 54–51 || W1
|-style=background:#cfc
|106||July 28|| Mets || 5–0 || Williams (9–7) || deGrom (5–6) ||—|| 35,900 || 55–51 || W2
|-style=background:#fbb
|107||July 29|| Mets || 0–1 || Wheeler (5–6) || Musgrove (4–5) || Swarzak (3) || 23,749 || 55–52 || L1
|-style=background:#cfc
|108||July 31|| Cubs || 5–4 || Taillon (8–8) || Lester (12–4) || Vázquez (24) || 18,972 || 56–52 || W1
|-

|-style=background:#fbb
|109||August 1|| Cubs || 2–9 || Hamels (6–9) || Kingham (5–6) ||—|| 18,600 || 56–53 || L1
|-style=background:#cfc
|110||August 3|| Cardinals || 7–6 || Crick (2–1) || Hicks (3–3) || Vázquez (25) || 26,773 || 57–53 || W1
|-style=background:#fbb
|111||August 4|| Cardinals || 4–8 || Hudson (2–0) || McRae (0–1) ||—|| 32,473 || 57–54 || L1
|-style=background:#fbb
|112||August 5|| Cardinals || 1–2 || Flaherty (5–6) || Williams (9–8) || Norris (21) || 19,376 || 57–55 || L2
|-style=background:#fbb
|113||August 6||@ Rockies || 0–2 || Freeland (10–7) || Musgrove (4–6) || Davis (32) || 34,471 || 57–56 || L3
|-style=background:#cfc
|114||August 7||@ Rockies || 10–2 || Taillon (9–8) || Bettis (5–2) ||—|| 31,649 || 58–56 || W1
|-style=background:#cfc
|115||August 8||@ Rockies || 4–3 || Archer (4–5) || Márquez (9–9) || Vázquez (26) || 35,702 || 59–56 || W2
|-style=background:#cfc
|116||August 9||@ Giants || 10–5 || Nova (7–6) || Suárez (4–8) ||—|| 40,035 || 60–56 || W3
|-style=background:#fbb
|117||August 10||@ Giants || 10–13 || Holland (6–8) || Holmes (1–2) ||—|| 41,762 || 60–57 || L1
|-style=background:#cfc
|118||August 11||@ Giants || 4–0 || Williams (10–8) || Blach (6–7) ||—|| 41,209 || 61–57 || W1
|-style=background:#fbb
|119||August 12||@ Giants || 3–4 || Rodríguez (6–1) || Musgrove (4–7) || Smith (8) || 41,980 || 61–58 || L1
|-style=background:#fbb
|120||August 14||@ Twins || 2–5 || Odorizzi (5–7) || Taillon (9–9) || Hildenberger (2) || 28,515 || 61–59 || L2
|-style=background:#fbb
|121||August 15||@ Twins || 4–6 || Moya (3–0) || Santana (2–2) || Hildenberger (3) || 26,191 || 61–60 || L3
|-style=background:#fbb
|122||August 16|| Cubs || 0–1 || Lester (13–5) || Nova (7–7) || Strop (10) || 21,783 || 61–61 || L4
|-style=background:#fbb
|123||August 17|| Cubs || 0–1 || Hamels (8–9) || Williams (10–9) || Chavez (2) || 24,298 || 61–62 || L5
|-style=background:#cfc
|124||August 18|| Cubs || 3–1 || Musgrove (5–7) || Chatwood (4–6) || Vázquez (27) || 35,100 || 62–62 || W1
|-style=background:#cfc
|125||August 19|| Cubs || 2–1 (11) || Rodríguez (3–2) || Kintzler (1–3) ||—|| 24,283 || 63–62 || W2
|-style=background:#fbb
|126||August 20|| Braves || 0–1 || Wilson (1–0) || Archer (4–6) || Winkler (2) || 16,445 || 63–63 || L1
|-style=background:#fbb
|127||August 21|| Braves || 1–6 || Gausman (8–9) || Nova (7–8) ||—|| 13,280 || 63–64 || L2
|-style=background:#fbb
|128||August 22|| Braves || 1–2 || Teherán (9–7) || Crick (2–2) || Venters (2) || 14,249 || 63–65 || L3
|-style=background:#fbb
|129||August 24||@ Brewers || 6–7 (15) || Lyles (3–4) || Holmes (1–3) ||—|| 32,694 || 63–66 || L4
|-style=background:#cfc
|130||August 25||@ Brewers || 9–1 || Taillon (10–9) || Chacín (13–5) ||—|| 40,622 || 64–66 || W1
|-style=background:#fbb
|131||August 26||@ Brewers || 4–7 || Anderson (9–7) || Archer (4–7) || Jeffress (7) || 39,607 || 64–67 || L1
|-style=background:#fbb
|132||August 28||@ Cardinals || 2–5 || Flaherty (8–6) || Nova (7–9) || Norris (28) || 35,258 || 64–68 || L2
|-style=background:#cfc
|133||August 29||@ Cardinals || 2–0 || Williams (11–9) || Mikolas (13–4) || Vázquez (28) || 33,448 || 65–68 || W1
|-style=background:#fbb
|134||August 30||@ Cardinals || 0–5 || Gant (6–5) || Musgrove (5–8) ||—|| 38,561 || 65–69 || L1
|-style=background:#cfc
|135||August 31||@ Braves || 3–2 ||  Taillon (11–9) || Brach (2–4) ||  Vázquez (29) || 36,650 || 66–69 || W1
|-

|-style=background:#fbb
|136||September 1||@ Braves || 3–5 || Venters (3–1) || Kela (3–4)  || Minter (12) || 33,705 || 66–70 || L1
|-style=background:#fbb
|137||September 2||@ Braves || 1–5 || Venters (4–1) || Brault (5–3) ||—|| 37,475 || 66–71 || L2
|-style=background:#cfc
|138||September 3|| Reds || 5–1 || Williams (12–9) || Harvey (6–8) ||—|| 13,843 || 67–71 || W1
|-style=background:#cfc
|139||September 4|| Reds || 7–3 || Musgrove (6–8) || Reed (0–2) ||—|| 8,855 || 68–71 || W2
|-style=background:#cfc
|140||September 5|| Reds || 3–2 || Taillon (12–9) || Bailey (1–14) || Vázquez (30) || 9,560 || 69–71 || W3
|-style=background:#cfc
|141||September 7|| Marlins || 5–3 || Rodríguez (4–2) || Guerrero (1–3) || Vázquez (31) || 19,515 || 70–71 || W4
|-style=background:#cfc
|142||September 8|| Marlins || 5–1 || Nova (8–9) || Chen (6–10) ||—|| 16,110 || 71–71 || W5
|-style=background:#bbb
|–||September 9|| Marlins ||  colspan="7" |CANCELLED, RAIN; will not be made up
|-style=background:#fbb
|143||September 10||@ Cardinals || 7–8 || Brebbia (2–3) || Santana (2–3) || Martínez (3) || 33,566 || 71–72 || L1
|-style=background:#fbb
|144||September 11||@ Cardinals || 5–11 || Mikolas (15–4) || Musgrove (6–9) ||—|| 37,187 || 71–73 || L2
|-style=background:#cfc
|145||September 12||@ Cardinals || 4–3 || Taillon (13–9) || Poncedeleon (0–2) ||Vázquez (32) || 39,606 || 72–73 || W1
|-style=background:#fbb
|146||September 14||@ Brewers || 4–7 || Burnes (5–0) || Archer (4–8) || Jeffress (12) || 39,482 || 72–74 || L1
|-style=background:#cfc
|147||September 15||@ Brewers || 3–1 || Nova (9–9) || Davies (2–6) || Vázquez (33) || 37,358 || 73–74 || W1
|-style=background:#cfc
|148||September 16||@ Brewers || 3–2 || Williams (13–9) || Chacín (14–8) || Vázquez (34) || 32,180 || 74–74 || W2
|-style=background:#cfc
|149||September 17|| Royals || 7–6 || Santana (3–3) || Lively (0–3) ||—|| 10,316 || 75–74 || W3
|-style=background:#cfc
|150||September 18|| Royals || 2–1 (11) || Crick (3–2) || Smith (1–5) ||—|| 11,566 || 76–74 || W4
|-style=background:#cfc
|151||September 19|| Royals || 2–1 || Archer (5–8) || Fillmyer (3–2) || Vázquez (35) || 13,073 || 77–74 || W5
|-style=background:#fbb
|152||September 21|| Brewers || 3–8 || Burnes (6–0) || Santana (3–4) || — || 19,243 || 77–75 || L1
|-style=background:#cfc
|153||September 22|| Brewers || 3–0 || Williams (14–9) || Davies (2–7) || Vázquez (36) || 23,070 || 78–75 || W1
|-style=background:#fbb
|154||September 23|| Brewers || 6–13 || Knebel (3–3) || Kingham (5–7) || — || 20,623 || 78–76 || L1
|-style=background:#cfc
|155||September 24||@ Cubs || 5–1 || Taillon (14–9) || Hamels (9–11) ||—|| 34,570 || 79–76 || W1
|-style=background:#cfc
|156||September 25||@ Cubs || 6–0 || Archer (6–8) || Montgomery (5–6) || — || 33,443 || 80–76 || W2
|-style=background:#fbb
|157||September 26||@ Cubs || 6–7 (10) || Kintzler (3–3) || Rodríguez (4–3) || — || 32,874 || 80–77 || L1
|-style=background:#fbb
|158||September 27||@ Cubs || 0–3 || Lester (18–6) || Williams (14–10) || Chavez (5) || 38,415 || 80–78 || L2
|-style=background:#cfc
|159||September 28||@ Reds || 8–4 || Brault (6–3) || DeSclafani (7–8) || — || 19,689 || 81–78 || W1
|-style=background:#fbb
|160||September 29||@ Reds || 0–3 || Lorenzen (4–2) || Taillon (14–10) || Iglesias (30) || 42,630 || 81–79 || L1
|-style=background:#cfc
|161||September 30||@ Reds || 6–5 (10) || Feliz (1–2) || Stephens (2–3) || Vázquez (37) || 25,091 || 82–79 || W1
|-

|- style="text-align:center;"
| Legend:       = Win       = Loss       = PostponementBold = Pirates team member

Roster

Opening Day lineup

Disabled lists

7-day disabled list

10-day disabled list

60-day disabled list

Notable achievements

Awards
National League Player of the Week
Jameson Taillon (April 2-April 8)

National League Rookie of the Month
Austin Meadows (May)

2018 Major League Baseball All-Star Game
Felipe Vázquez, P

Transactions
The Pirates were involved in the following transactions during the 2018 season:

Trades

Free agents

Waivers

Signings

Other

Farm system
List of minor leagues staff:

References

External links
 2018 Pittsburgh Pirates at Baseball Reference
 Pittsburgh Pirates official site

Pittsburgh Pirates seasons
Pittsburgh Pirates
Pittsburgh Pirates